Cercis chinensis, the Chinese redbud, is a plant in the legume the family Fabaceae, native to China.

Description

The flowers are pink or milky white in color whilst the leaf body is almost circular in shape,  in length and tapers to a point at the end. Flowering in April, the Chinese redbud produces fruit in October.

Cultivation
Although hardy, in cultivation this plant requires a sheltered spot in a southerly or westerly aspect, with damp well-drained soil. 

The following cultivars have gained the Royal Horticultural Society’s Award of Garden Merit (confirmed 2017): 
C. chinensis ‘Avondale’ 
C. chinensis ‘Don Egolf’

References

chinensis
Taxa named by Alexander von Bunge